Madge Judith Dresser FRHS FRSA was formerly an Associate Professor in History at the University of the West of England, and is currently Honorary Professor in the department of Historical Studies at the University of Bristol. Her specialities are the history of slavery, national identity, women's history, and the position of religious and ethnic minorities in British society.

She is active in Journey to Justice, a Bristolian charity highlighting the history of social justice and marginalised voices.

She has frequently made efforts to acknowledge the role of Edward Colston in Bristol's slave trade industry, noting the "reluctance in some quarters" to mention it in relation to the statue of him. As such, she has been involved with the rewording process of the statue's plaque.

Published works

References

Living people
Year of birth missing (living people)
21st-century English historians
21st-century British women writers
British women historians
Academics of the University of the West of England, Bristol
Academics of the University of Bristol
Historians of slavery
Fellows of the Royal Historical Society